Stephen Tyrone Colbert (born May 13, 1964) is an American comedian, writer, producer, political commentator, actor, and television host. He is best known for hosting the satirical Comedy Central program The Colbert Report from 2005 to 2014 and the CBS talk program The Late Show with Stephen Colbert beginning in September 2015.

Colbert originally studied to be a dramatic actor, but became interested in improvisational theater while attending Northwestern University, where he met Second City director Del Close. Colbert first performed professionally as an understudy for Steve Carell at Second City Chicago, where his troupemates included Paul Dinello and Amy Sedaris, comedians with whom he developed the sketch comedy series Exit 57. He wrote and performed on The Dana Carvey Show before collaborating with Sedaris and Dinello again on the television series Strangers with Candy. He gained attention for his role on the latter as closeted gay history teacher Chuck Noblet.

Colbert's work as a correspondent on Comedy Central's news-parody series The Daily Show gained him wide recognition. In 2005, he left The Daily Show to host The Colbert Report. Following The Daily Shows news-parody concept, The Colbert Report was a parody of personality-driven political opinion shows including The O'Reilly Factor, in which he portrayed a caricatured version of conservative political pundits, earning Colbert an invitation to perform as featured entertainer at the White House Correspondents' Association Dinner in 2006, which he did in character. This event led to the series becoming one of Comedy Central's highest-rated series.  After ending The Colbert Report, he was hired in 2015 to succeed retiring David Letterman as host of the Late Show on CBS. He hosted the 69th Primetime Emmy Awards in September 2017.

Colbert has won nine Primetime Emmy Awards, two Grammy Awards, and three Peabody Awards. Colbert was named one of Times 100 Most Influential People in 2006 and 2012. Colbert's book I Am America (And So Can You!) was listed No.1 on The New York Times Best Seller list in 2007.

Early life 
Colbert was born in Washington, D.C., the youngest of eleven children in a Catholic family. He spent his early years in Bethesda, Maryland. He grew up in the Charleston suburb of James Island, South Carolina. Colbert and his siblings, in descending order by age, are James III, Edward, Mary, William, Margo, Thomas, Jay, Elizabeth, Paul, Peter, and Stephen. His father, James William Colbert Jr., was an immunologist and medical school dean at Yale University, Saint Louis University, and finally at the Medical University of South Carolina, where, from 1969, he served as the school's first vice president of academic affairs. Stephen's mother, Lorna Elizabeth Colbert (née Tuck), was a homemaker.

In interviews, Colbert has described his parents as devout people who also strongly valued intellectualism, and taught their children it was possible to question the church, and still be Catholic. In an interview, Lorna has described Stephen as rambunctious. As a child, he observed that Southerners were often depicted as being less intelligent than other characters on scripted television; to avoid that stereotype, he taught himself to imitate the speech of American news anchors.

While Colbert sometimes comedically claims his surname is French, he is of 15/16ths Irish ancestry; one of his paternal great-great-grandmothers was of German and English descent. Many of his ancestors emigrated from Ireland to North America in the 19th century before and during the Great Famine. Originally, his surname was pronounced   in English; Stephen Colbert's father, James, wanted to pronounce the name  , but maintained the  pronunciation out of respect for his own father. He offered his children the option to pronounce the name whichever way they preferred. Stephen started using  later in life when he transferred to Northwestern University, taking advantage of the opportunity to reinvent himself in a new place where no one knew him. Stephen's brother Edward, an intellectual property attorney, retained ; this was shown in a February 12, 2009, appearance on The Colbert Report, when his second oldest brother asked him, " or ?" Ed responded "", to which Stephen jokingly replied, "See you in Hell".

On September 11, 1974, when Colbert was ten years old, his father and his two brothers nearest in age, Peter and Paul, died in the crash of Eastern Air Lines Flight 212 while it was attempting to land in Charlotte, North Carolina. They were en route to enroll the two boys at Canterbury School in New Milford, Connecticut. He has discussed the impact on him and his philosophy of grief and suffering. Lorna Colbert relocated the family from James Island to the George Chisolm House, in downtown Charleston and ran the carriage house as a bed and breakfast. Colbert found the transition difficult and did not easily make friends in his new neighborhood. Colbert later described himself during this time as detached, lacking a sense of importance regarding the things with which other children concerned themselves.

He developed a love of science fiction and fantasy novels, especially the works of J. R. R. Tolkien, of which he remains an avid fan. During his adolescence, he also developed an intense interest in fantasy role-playing games, especially Dungeons & Dragons, a pastime which he later characterized as an early experience in acting and improvisation.

Colbert attended Charleston's Episcopal Porter-Gaud School, where he participated in several school plays and contributed to the school newspaper but was not highly motivated academically. During his adolescence, he briefly fronted A Shot in the Dark, a Rolling Stones cover band. When he was younger, he had hoped to study marine biology, but surgery intended to repair a severely perforated eardrum caused him inner ear damage severe enough to preclude a career involving scuba diving, and leaving him deaf in his right ear.

For a while, he was uncertain whether he would attend college, but ultimately he applied and was accepted to Hampden–Sydney College in Virginia, where a friend had also enrolled. Arriving in 1982, he majored in philosophy and continued to participate in plays. He found the curriculum rigorous, but was more focused than he had been in high school and was able to apply himself to his studies. Despite the lack of a significant theater community at Hampden–Sydney, Colbert's interest in acting escalated during this time. After two years, he transferred in 1984 to Northwestern University as a theater major to study performance, emboldened by the realization that he loved performing, even when no one was coming to shows. He graduated from Northwestern's School of Communication in 1986.

Early career in comedy 

While at Northwestern, Colbert studied with the intent of becoming a dramatic actor; mostly he performed in experimental plays and was uninterested in comedy. He began performing improvisation while in college, both in the campus improv team No Fun Mud Piranhas and at the Annoyance Theatre in Chicago as a part of Del Close's ImprovOlympic at a time when the project was focused on competitive, long-form improvisation, rather than improvisational comedy. "I wasn't gonna do Second City", Colbert later recalled, "because those Annoyance people looked down on Second City because they thought it wasn't pure improv – there was a slightly snobby, mystical quality to the Annoyance people". After Colbert graduated in 1986, however, he was in need of a job. A friend who was employed at Second City's box office offered him work answering phones and selling souvenirs. Colbert accepted and discovered that Second City employees were entitled to take classes at their training center free of charge. Despite his earlier aversion to the comedy group, he signed up for improvisation classes and enjoyed the experience greatly.

Shortly thereafter, he was hired to perform with Second City's touring company, initially as an understudy for Steve Carell. It was there he met Amy Sedaris and Paul Dinello, with whom he often collaborated later in his career. By their retelling, the three comedians did not get along at first – Dinello thought Colbert was uptight, pretentious and cold, while Colbert thought of Dinello as "an illiterate thug" – but the trio became close friends while touring together, discovering that they shared a similar comic sensibility.

When Sedaris and Dinello were offered the opportunity to create a television series for HBO Downtown Productions, Colbert left Second City and relocated to New York to work with them on the sketch comedy show Exit 57. The series debuted on Comedy Central in 1995 and aired through 1996. Although it lasted only 12 episodes, the show received favorable reviews and was nominated for five CableACE Awards in 1995, in categories including best writing, performance, and comedy series.

Television career

The Dana Carvey Show (1996) 

Following the cancelation of Exit 57, Colbert worked for six months as a cast member and writer on The Dana Carvey Show, alongside former Second City castmate Steve Carell, and also Robert Smigel, Charlie Kaufman, Louis C.K., and Dino Stamatopoulos, among others. The series, described by one reviewer as "kamikaze satire" in "borderline-questionable taste", had sponsors pull out after its first episode aired and was canceled after seven episodes. Colbert then worked briefly as a freelance writer for Saturday Night Live with Robert Smigel. Smigel brought his animated sketch, The Ambiguously Gay Duo, to SNL from The Dana Carvey Show; Colbert provided the voice of Ace on both series, opposite Steve Carell as Gary. Needing money, he also worked as a script consultant for VH1 and MTV, before taking a job filming humorous correspondent segments for Good Morning America. Only two of the segments he proposed were ever produced and only one aired, but the job led his agent to refer him to The Daily Show's producer, Madeline Smithberg, who hired Colbert on a trial basis in 1997.

Strangers with Candy (1999–2000) 

During the same period, Colbert worked again with Sedaris and Dinello to develop a new comedy series for Comedy Central, Strangers with Candy. Comedy Central picked up the series in 1998 after Colbert had already begun working on The Daily Show. As a result, he accepted a reduced role, filming only around 20 Daily Show segments a year while he worked on the new series.

Strangers with Candy was conceived of as a parody of after school specials, following the life of Jerri Blank, a 46-year-old dropout who returns to finish high school after 32 years of life on the street. Most noted by critics for its use of offensive humor, it concluded each episode by delivering to the audience a skewed, politically incorrect moral lesson. Colbert served as a main writer alongside Sedaris and Dinello, and portrayed Jerri's strict but uninformed history teacher, Chuck Noblet, seen throughout the series dispensing inaccurate information to his classes. Colbert has likened this to the character he played on The Daily Show and later The Colbert Report, claiming that he has a very specific niche in portraying "poorly informed, high-status idiot" characters. Another running joke throughout the series was that Noblet, a closeted homosexual, was having a "secret" affair with fellow teacher Geoffrey Jellineck, despite the fact that their relationship was apparent to everyone around them. This obliviousness also appears in Colbert's Daily Show and Colbert Report character.

Thirty episodes of Strangers with Candy were made, which aired on Comedy Central in 1999 and 2000. Though its ratings were not remarkable during its initial run, it has been characterized as a cult show with a small but dedicated audience. Colbert reprised his role for a film adaptation which premiered at the Sundance Film Festival in 2005 and had a limited release in 2006. The film received mixed reviews. Colbert also co-wrote the screenplay with Sedaris and Dinello.

The Daily Show (1997–2005) 

Colbert joined the cast of Comedy Central's parody-news series The Daily Show in 1997, when the show was in its second season. Originally one of four correspondents who filmed segments from remote locations in the style of network news field reporters, Colbert was referred to as "the new guy" on-air for his first two years on the show, during which time Craig Kilborn served as host. When Kilborn left the show prior to the 1999 season, Jon Stewart took over hosting duties, also serving as a writer and co-executive producer. From this point, the series gradually began to take on a more political tone and increase in popularity, particularly in the latter part of the 2000 U.S. presidential election season. The roles of the show's correspondents were expanded to include more in-studio segments and international reports, which were almost always done in the studio with the aid of a greenscreen.

Unlike Stewart, who essentially hosted The Daily Show as himself, Colbert developed a correspondent character for his pieces on the series that was a parody of conservative political pundits such as Bill O'Reilly. Colbert has described his correspondent character as "a well-intentioned, poorly informed, high-status idiot" and "a fool who has spent a lot of his life playing not the fool – one who is able to cover it at least well enough to deal with the subjects that he deals with". Colbert was frequently pitted against knowledgeable interview subjects, or against Stewart in scripted exchanges, with the resultant dialogue demonstrating the character's lack of knowledge of whatever subject he is discussing. Colbert also made generous use of humorous fallacies of logic in explaining his point of view on any topic. Other Daily Show correspondents have adopted a similar style; former correspondent Rob Corddry recalls that when he and Ed Helms first joined the show's cast in 2002, they "just imitated Stephen Colbert for a year or two". Correspondent Aasif Mandvi has stated "I just decided I was going to do my best Stephen Colbert impression".

Colbert appeared in several recurring segments for The Daily Show, including "Even Stevphen" with Steve Carell, in which both characters were expected to debate a selected topic but instead would unleash their anger at one another. Colbert commonly hosted "This Week in God", a report on topics in the news pertaining to religion, presented with the help of the "God Machine". Colbert filed reports from the floor of the Democratic National Convention and the Republican National Convention as a part of The Daily Show's award-winning coverage of the 2000 and 2004 U.S. presidential elections; many from the latter were included as part of their The Daily Show: Indecision 2004 DVD release. Other pieces that have been named as his signature segments include "Grouse Hunting in Shropshire", in which he reported on the "gayness" of British aristocracy, his mock lionization of a smoking-rights activist and apparent chain-smoker, and his cameo appearances during his faux campaign for president. In several episodes of The Daily Show, Colbert filled in as anchor in the absence of Jon Stewart, including the full week of March 3, 2002, when Stewart was scheduled to host Saturday Night Live. After Colbert left the show, Rob Corddry took over "This Week in God" segments, although a recorded sample of Colbert's voice was still used as the sound effect for the God Machine. Later episodes of The Daily Show have reused older Colbert segments under the label "Klassic Kolbert". Colbert won three Emmys as a writer of The Daily Show in 2004, 2005, and 2006.

The Colbert Report (2005–2014) 

Colbert hosted his own television show, The Colbert Report, from October 17, 2005, through December 18, 2014. The Colbert Report was a Daily Show spin-off that parodied the conventions of television news broadcasting, particularly cable-personality political talk shows like The O'Reilly Factor, Hannity, and Glenn Beck. Colbert hosted the show in-character as a blustery right-wing pundit, generally considered to be an extension of his character on The Daily Show. Conceived by co-creators Stewart, Colbert, and Ben Karlin in part as an opportunity to explore "the character-driven news", the series focused less on the day-to-day news style of the Daily Show, instead frequently concentrating on the foibles of the host-character himself.

The concept for The Report was first seen in a series of Daily Show segments which advertised the then-fictional series as a joke. It was later developed by Stewart's Busboy Productions and pitched to Comedy Central, which green-lighted the program; Comedy Central had already been searching for a way to extend the successful Daily Show franchise beyond a half-hour. The series opened to strong ratings, averaging 1.2 million viewers nightly during its first week on the air. Comedy Central signed a long-term contract for The Colbert Report within its first month on the air, when it immediately established itself among the network's highest-rated shows.

Much of Colbert's personal life was reflected in his character on The Colbert Report. With the extended exposure of the character on the show, he often referenced his interest in and knowledge of Catholicism, science fiction, and The Lord of the Rings, as well as using real facts to create his character's history. His alternate persona was also raised in South Carolina, is the youngest of 11 siblings and is married. However, Colbert's actual career history in acting and comedy was often downplayed or even denied outright, and he frequently referred to having attended Dartmouth College (which was at the forefront of the conservative campus movement in the 1980s) rather than his actual alma mater, Northwestern. In July 2012, Colbert added two years to his contract with Comedy Central, extending the run of The Colbert Report until the end of 2014.

The final episode on December 18, 2014, featured a rendition of "We'll Meet Again" and appearances from former guests of the show, including Jon Stewart, Randy Newman, Bryan Cranston, Willie Nelson, Yo-Yo Ma, Mandy Patinkin, Neil deGrasse Tyson, Tom Brokaw, David Gregory, J. J. Abrams, Big Bird, Gloria Steinem, Ken Burns, James Franco, Barry Manilow, Bob Costas, Jeff Daniels, Sam Waterston, Bill de Blasio, Katie Couric, Patrick Stewart, George Lucas, Henry Kissinger, Cookie Monster, Alan Alda, Eliot Spitzer, Vince Gilligan, Paul Krugman, and a text from Bill Clinton, and appearances by Alex Trebek, U.S. and coalition Afghanistan forces, and further characters (a space station astronaut, Santa Claus, Abraham Lincoln, etc.).

The Late Show (since 2015) 

On April 10, 2014, CBS announced in a press release that Colbert "will succeed David Letterman as the host of The Late Show, effective when Mr. Letterman retires from the broadcast." On January 12, 2015, CBS announced that Colbert would premiere as the Late Show host on Tuesday, September 8, 2015. The first guest of the new Late Show was George Clooney. The show has a much more political focus than David Letterman's Late Show.

During his tenure as the host of The Late Show, Colbert hosted the 69th Primetime Emmy Awards, broadcast on CBS on September 17, 2017. More recently, he and his Spartina Productions company had signed a deal with CBS Studios, through which programs such as Tooning Out the News and Fairview are produced. Colbert is also an executive producer on Comedy Central's Tha God's Honest Truth.

Politics 
Although, by his own account, he was not particularly political before joining the cast of The Daily Show, Colbert has described himself as a Democrat according to a 2004 interview. In an interview at the Kennedy School of Government at Harvard Institute of Politics, he said he has "no problems with Republicans, just Republican policies".

Colbert supports the implementation of the Medicare for All plan introduced by Bernie Sanders, considering it "a sensible fix to Obamacare". When asked about his views on abortion, Colbert positioned himself as pro-choice. On the intersection of faith and politics, Colbert has pointed out that his views are in line with those of Cesar Chávez.

2006 White House Correspondents' Dinner 

On Saturday, April 29, 2006, Colbert was the featured entertainer for the 2006 White House Correspondents' Association Dinner. Standing a few yards from U.S. President George W. Bush – in front of an audience the Associated Press called a "Who's Who of power and celebrity" – Colbert delivered a searing routine targeting the president and the media. In his politically conservative character from The Colbert Report, Colbert satirized the George W. Bush Administration and the White House Press Corps with such lines as:

Colbert received a chilly response from the audience. His jokes were often met with silence and muttering, apart from the enthusiastic laughter of a few in the audience. The major media outlets paid little attention to it initially. Washington Post columnist Dan Froomkin and Columbia University Graduate School of Journalism professor Todd Gitlin claimed that this was because Colbert's routine was as critical of the media as it was of Bush. Richard Cohen, also writing for The Washington Post, responded that the routine was not funny. The video of Colbert's performance became an internet and media sensation, while in the week following the speech, ratings for The Colbert Report rose by 37% to average just under 1.5 million total viewers per episode. In Time magazine, James Poniewozik called it "the political-cultural touchstone issue of 2006". Writing six months later, New York Times columnist Frank Rich referred to Colbert's speech as a "cultural primary" and called it the "defining moment" of the 2006 midterm elections.

2008 presidential bid 

Under his fictional persona in The Colbert Report, Colbert dropped hints of a potential presidential run throughout 2007, with speculation intensifying following the release of his book, I Am America (And So Can You!), which was rumored to be a sign that he was indeed testing the waters for a future bid for the White House. On October 16, 2007, he announced his candidacy on his show, stating his intention to run on both the Republican and Democratic platforms, but only as a "favorite son" in his native South Carolina. He later abandoned plans to run as a Republican due to the $35,000 fee required to file for the South Carolina primary; however, he continued to seek a place on the Democratic ballot and on October 28, 2007, campaigned in the South Carolina state capital of Columbia, where he was presented with the key to the city by Mayor Bob Coble.

After announcing his presidential ticket, he asked his viewers to cast their votes by donating to Donorschoose.org, an online charity connecting individuals to classrooms in need.
Colbert's promotion inspired $68,000 in donations to South Carolina classrooms, which benefited over 14,000 low-income students.
Colbert teamed up with Donorschoose.org again in 2008 by asking supporters of Barack Obama and Hillary Clinton to do the same. As a lead-up to the Pennsylvania primary, he created a "straw poll that makes a difference" by which people could donate to Pennsylvania classroom projects in honor of their favorite candidate.
Colbert viewers donated $185,000 to projects reaching 43,000 students in Pennsylvania public schools.

On November 1, 2007, the South Carolina Democratic Party executive council voted 13–3 to refuse Colbert's application onto the ballot. "The general sense of the council was that he wasn't a serious candidate and that was why he wasn't selected to be on the ballot", stated John Werner, the party's director. Several days later he announced that he was dropping out of the race, saying he did not wish to put the country through an agonizing Supreme Court battle (referencing the 2000 election, wherein a tight recount in Florida was settled in a landmark Supreme Court decision). CNN has reported that Obama supporters pressured the South Carolina Democratic Executive Council to keep Colbert off the ballot. One anonymous member of the council told CNN that former State Superintendent of Education Inez Tenenbaum had placed pressure on them to refuse Colbert's application despite his steady rise in polls.

Though Colbert's real-life presidential campaign had ended, Marvel Comics editor-in-chief Joe Quesada established in an interview on The Colbert Report that Colbert's campaign was still going strong in the fictional Marvel Universe, citing the cover art of a then-recent issue of The Amazing Spider-Man which featured a Colbert campaign billboard in the background. Background appearances of Colbert campaign ads continued to appear in Marvel Comics publications, as late as August 2008's Secret Invasion No.5 (which also features a cameo of an alien Skrull posing as Colbert). In October 2008, Colbert made an extended 8-page appearance webslinging with Spider-Man in The Amazing Spider-Man issue No. 573. Colbert voiced the president of the U.S. in the 2009 film Monsters vs. Aliens.

2009 solidarity with U.S. troops in Iraq War 

Colbert arrived in Baghdad, Iraq, on June 5, 2009, to film a week of shows called "Operation Iraqi Stephen: Going Commando" sponsored by the USO (United Service Organizations). Colbert had a suit tailored for him in the Army Combat Uniform pattern. During the first episode (which featured a cameo appearance from U.S. president Barack Obama), Colbert had his hair cropped in a military style to show his solidarity with the troops. One Army major said that "shaving of the hair is an amazing show of support" that was "very touching." USO Senior Vice President John Hanson said the shows are an important diversion for the troops.

2010 Congressional testimony 
On September 24, 2010, Colbert testified in character before the House Judiciary Subcommittee on Immigration, Citizenship, and Border Security. He was invited by committee chairwoman Zoe Lofgren to describe his experience participating in the United Farm Workers' "Take Our Jobs" program, where he spent a day working alongside migrant workers in upstate New York. At the end of his often-humorous testimony, Colbert broke character in responding to a question from Rep. Judy Chu, D-CA, and explained his purpose for being at the hearing:

Democratic committee member John Conyers questioned whether it was appropriate for the comedian to appear before Congress and asked him to leave the hearing. Though Colbert offered to depart at the direction of the committee chairwoman, Lofgren requested that he stay at least until all opening testimony had been completed, whereupon Conyers withdrew his request.

Conservative pundits took aim at Colbert's Congress testimony not long after.

2010 Washington, D.C. rallies 

In September 2010, following Glenn Beck's Restoring Honor rally, a campaign developed that called for Colbert to hold his own rally at the Lincoln Memorial. On the September 10, 2010, episode of the Daily Show and The Colbert Report, Stewart and Colbert made preannouncements of a future event. On September 16, 2010, Stewart and Colbert announced competing rallies on the Washington, D.C., Mall on October 30, 2010, Stewart's "Rally to Restore Sanity", and Colbert's "March to Keep Fear Alive". Both were eventually merged into the Rally to Restore Sanity and/or Fear.

2011 Political Super PAC 

In May 2011, Colbert filed a request with the Federal Election Commission (FEC) asking for a media exemption for coverage of his political action committee, ColbertPAC, on The Colbert Report.

In June 2011, during a public meeting, the FEC voted 5–1 to grant The Colbert Report a limited media exemption. The exemption allows unlimited donations of airtime and show resources to promote the Colbert Super PAC without requiring disclosure to the FEC, but only for ads appearing on The Colbert Report. Following the hearing, Colbert formally filed paperwork for the creation of his Super PAC with the FEC secretary.

2012 South Carolina GOP primary 
After the 2012 New Hampshire primary, a poll for the subsequent South Carolina primary taken by Public Policy Polling (of 1,112 likely GOP voters, Jan 5–7, 2012) was reported to place Colbert at 5%, one point ahead of Jon Huntsman polling at 4%, in spite of the fact that Colbert was not on the ballot. This poll showed Colbert to be closely behind Rick Perry's 7% and Ron Paul's 8% (with Romney at 27%, Gingrich 23% and Santorum at 18%). On the January 11 episode of The Colbert Report, Colbert asked his audience if he should run for president in South Carolina, to which he received strong applause. He then stated that he would be making a "Major Announcement" during the next day's show. On January 12, Colbert started his show by discussing his role in the presidential campaign, then addressed the law preventing him from being a presidential candidate while running his Super PAC. With the help of his lawyer Trevor Potter, he then signed over control of his Super PAC to Jon Stewart, with the organization title then being referred to as "The Definitely Not Coordinating With Stephen Colbert Super PAC". Immediately after this legal block was out of the way, Colbert announced, "I am forming an exploratory committee to lay the groundwork for my possible candidacy for the President of the United States of South Carolina. I'm doin' it!" He reiterated in the interview portion of that show that "I'm still in the exploratory phase" of his presidential campaign.

On the January 16, 2012, episode, Colbert satirically encouraged his viewers to vote for Herman Cain in the South Carolina primary. As Cain was still on the ballot, despite having recently dropped out of the race, Colbert announced that he would consider any votes cast for Cain to be in direct support of his own possible candidacy.

Other work 
Colbert is co-author of the satirical text-and-picture novel Wigfield: The Can Do Town That Just May Not, which was published in 2003 by Hyperion Books. The novel was a collaboration between Colbert, Amy Sedaris, and Paul Dinello, and tells the story of a small town threatened by the impending destruction of a massive dam. The narrative is presented as a series of fictional interviews with the town's residents, accompanied by photos. The three authors toured performing an adaptation of Wigfield on stage the same year the book was released.

Colbert appeared in a small supporting role in the 2005 film adaptation of Bewitched. He has made guest appearances on the television series Curb Your Enthusiasm, Spin City, and Law & Order: Criminal Intent, and on the first season of the US improvisational comedy show Whose Line Is It Anyway?. He voiced the characters of Reducto and Phil Ken Sebben in the Adult Swim's Harvey Birdman, Attorney at Law, but left the show in 2005 to work on The Colbert Report. His characters were both killed, though he returned to voice Phil for the series finale. Colbert also has provided voices for Cartoon Network's The Venture Bros., Comedy Central's Crank Yankers, and American Dad!, and for Canadian animated comedy series The Wrong Coast. He appeared as Homer Simpson's life coach, Colby Krause, in The Simpsons episode "He Loves to Fly and He D'ohs".

Colbert filled in for Sam Seder on the second episode of The Majority Report on Air America Radio, and has also done reports for The Al Franken Show. He appeared on a track on Wig in a Box, a tribute album for Hedwig and the Angry Inch. Colbert read the part of Leopold Bloom in Bloomsday on Broadway XXIV: Love Literature Language Lust: Leopold's Women Bloom on June 16, 2005, at Symphony Space in New York City. He appeared in a series of TV commercials for General Motors, as a not-too-bright investigator searching for the elusive (and non-existent in real life) "Mr. Goodwrench". He also portrayed the letter Z in Sesame Street: All-Star Alphabet, a 2005 video release.

Colbert is a producer of The 1 Second Film, the world's largest nonprofit collaborative art film. His video request that IMDb list his credit for The1 Second Film ("it is as valid as most of my credits") enabled thousands of the film's producers to be listed in the massive movie database until they were removed in early 2007.

Colbert has released one book associated with The Colbert Report, I Am America (And So Can You!). It was released on October 7, 2007, by Grand Central Publishing. Grand Central Publishing is the successor to Warner Books, which published America (The Book), written by The Daily Show staff. The book contains similar political satire, but was written primarily by Colbert himself rather than as a collaboration with his Colbert Report writing staff.

On November 23, 2008, his Christmas special, A Colbert Christmas: The Greatest Gift of All!, aired on Comedy Central. It was released on DVD in November 2008.

In January 2010, Colbert was named the assistant sports psychologist for the US Olympic speed skating team at the 2010 Winter Olympics. He was also invited to be part of NBC's 2010 Winter Olympics coverage team by Dick Ebersol, chairman of NBC Universal Sports. In April 2011, Colbert performed as Harry in the concert-style revival of Stephen Sondheim's musical Company, presented by the New York Philharmonic at the Lincoln Center. The show, featuring Neil Patrick Harris in the starring role, ran for four nights and was filmed for later showings in movie theaters, which began June 15. In May 2011, Colbert joined the Charleston to Bermuda Race yachting race, as captain of the ship "the Spirit of Juno". He finished second, five miles behind leaders "Tucana".

Since 2012, Colbert has collaborated with the Montclair Film Festival, of which his wife is a founder and current president of its board. Every year since its foundation, Colbert has participated by hosting an annual fundraising event and leading Q&As and conversations with directors, writers, journalists, and actors such as: Jon Stewart, Rob Reiner, Steve Carell, J. J. Abrams, David Itzkoff, Ethan Hawke, Rachel Weisz, and Meryl Streep. He is also part of the Montclair Film advisory board.

After the resignation of South Carolina Senator Jim DeMint to run Heritage Foundation, Colbert was named a possible candidate for appointment to the seat being vacated by DeMint, which would have triggered a special election in 2014 to finish out DeMint's term. Although Governor Nikki Haley announced promptly that she had no intention to nominate Colbert to the Senate, a poll showed Colbert as a favorite among South Carolina voters.

Colbert guest-hosted Only in Monroe, a public access television show in Monroe, Michigan, for an episode that aired July 1, 2015. He interviewed the program's regular hosts, and also the rapper Eminem (whom he pretended never to have heard of), and put a humorous slant on the local news and community calendar.

On July 17, 2016, Colbert hijacked the 2016 Republican National Convention in Cleveland, Ohio, while dressed as Caesar Flickerman from The Hunger Games series. After he was taken down from the stage, he commented, "Look, I know I am not supposed to be up here but let's be honest, neither is Donald Trump." Colbert also dressed as Flickerman on his show, prior to the stunt, to announce the candidates who had ended their runs in the 2016 election.

Aside from hosting his talk shows, Colbert has gone on to host other types of shows. Since 2014, Colbert has hosted the Kennedy Center Honors for three consecutive years. In 2017, Colbert hosted the 69th Primetime Emmy Awards.

In 2018 it was reported that Showtime was developing Hello Nancy, a biopic based on the nonfiction book On Her Trail, My Mother, Nancy Dickerson, TV News' First Woman Star by John Dickerson, with Colbert and his wife Evelyn serving as executive producers. The couple also served as executive producers for In & Of Itself, a film version of Derek DelGaudio's off-Broadway show of the same name.

Influences 
Colbert has said his comedy influences include: Don Novello, Phil Silvers, Alec Guinness, Bill Cosby, George Carlin, Dean Martin, Jon Stewart, Monty Python, Steve Martin, and David Letterman. In 2017, Colbert said due to the sexual assault allegations made against Cosby, he can no longer listen to his comedy.

Colbert has also cited Jim Gaffigan, Maria Bamford, Joe Pera, John Mulaney, and Eric Andre, as some of his favorite contemporary comedians.

Among comedians who say they were influenced by Colbert are Nathan Fielder, James Corden, Mindy Kaling, Hasan Minhaj, Jordan Klepper, Ziwe Fumudoh, John Mulaney, Derrick Beckles, Julie Klausner,  and Billy Eichner.

Personal life 

Colbert is a practicing Roman Catholic and used to teach Sunday school. He is an ordained minister with the Universal Life Church Monastery. Colbert is an avid reader and his favorite authors include: J.R.R. Tolkien, J.D. Salinger, Robertson Davies, George Saunders, Larry Niven, Henry Kuttner, and Isaac Asimov.

Colbert has been married to Evelyn "Evie" McGee-Colbert since 1993. She is the daughter of prominent Charleston civil litigator Joseph McGee, of the firm Buist Moore Smythe McGee. His wife appeared with him in an episode of Strangers with Candy as his mother. She also had an uncredited cameo as a nurse in the series pilot and a credited one (as his wife Clair) in the film. McGee-Colbert actually met Jon Stewart before she met her future husband in 1990. They met at the world premiere of Hydrogen Jukebox at the Spoleto Festival USA in Charleston. Colbert later described the first moment he met Evie as being a love at first sight encounter; however, moments after they met, they both realized they had grown up together in Charleston and had many mutual friends.

The couple have three children. They live in Montclair, New Jersey.

The couple are friends with Broadway actress Jackie Hoffman, who jokingly made a sceneto the shock of Evelyn's unknowing side of their 1993 weddingwhen she did not catch Evelyn's bouquet.

During his college and Second City years, Colbert suffered from bouts of depression and anxiety, for which he had to be medicated. In a 2018 interview, Colbert told Rolling Stone:

Colbert used the Myers–Briggs Type Indicator during a segment of The Late Show, which identified him as an INFP.

Awards and honors 

In 2000, Colbert and the other Daily Show writers were the recipients of three Emmy Awards as writers for The Daily Show and again in 2005 and 2006. In 2005 he was nominated for a Satellite Award for his performance on The Colbert Report and again in 2006. He was also nominated for three Emmys for The Colbert Report in 2006, including Best Performance in a Variety, Musical Program or Special, which he lost to Barry Manilow. Manilow and Colbert would go on to jokingly sign and notarize a revolving biannual custody agreement for the Emmy on The Colbert Report episode aired on October 30, 2006. He lost the same category to Tony Bennett in 2007 and Don Rickles in 2008.

In January 2006, the American Dialect Society named truthiness, which Colbert coined on the premiere episode of The Colbert Report, as its 2005 Word of the Year. Colbert devoted time on five successive episodes to bemoaning the failure of the Associated Press to mention his role in popularizing the word truthiness in its news coverage of the Word of the Year. On December 9, 2006, Merriam-Webster also announced that it selected truthiness as its Word of the Year for 2006. Votes were accepted on their website, and according to poll results, "truthiness" won by a five-to-one margin.

In June 2006, after speaking at the school's commencement ceremony, Colbert received an honorary Doctorate of Fine Arts degree from Knox College.  Time named Stephen Colbert as one of the 100 most influential people in 2006 and 2012 and in May 2006, New York magazine listed Colbert (and Jon Stewart) as one of its top dozen influential persons in media. Colbert was named Person of the Year by the U.S. Comedy Arts Festival in Aspen, Colorado on March 3, 2007, and was also given the Speaker of the Year Award by The Cross Examination Debate Association (CEDA) on March 24, 2007, for his "drive to expose the rhetorical shortcomings of contemporary political discourse".

Colbert was named the 2nd Sexiest TV News Anchor in September 2006 by Maxim, next to Mélissa Theuriau of France and was the only man featured on the list. In November 2006, he was named a "sexy surprise" by People in the Sexiest Man Alive honors and in the December 2006 issue of GQ he was named one of GQ's "Men of the Year".
In 2012, he was listed as No. 69 on Maxim Magazine's Hot 100, becoming the first man to be included on the list.

Colbert has received three Peabody Awards, in 2007, 2011, and 2020. He was nominated for five TCA Awards for The Colbert Report by the Television Critics Association.

After the Saginaw Spirit defeated the Oshawa Generals in Ontario Junior League Hockey, Oshawa Mayor John Gray declared March 20, 2007 (the mayor's own birthday), Stephen Colbert Day, honoring a previous bet with Stephen. At the event, Mayor Gray referred to the publicity the bet brought the city, remarking, "This is the way to lose a bet".

Colbert was honored for the Gutsiest Move on the Spike TV Guys' Choice Awards on June 13, 2007, for his performance at the 2006 White House Correspondents' Association Dinner. In August 2007, Virgin America named an airplane, "Air Colbert", in his honor. On October 28, 2007, Colbert received the key to the city of Columbia, South Carolina, from Mayor Bob Coble.

On December 20, 2007, Colbert was named Celebrity of the Year by The Associated Press. On April 2, 2008, he received a Peabody Award for The Colbert Report, saying in response, "I proudly accept this award and begrudgingly forgive the Peabody Committee for taking three years to recognize greatness".

In 2008, Colbert won the Emmy Award for writing again, this time as a writer for The Colbert Report. Colbert delivered the Class Day address to the graduating class of Princeton University on June 2, 2008, and accepted the Class of 2008 Understandable Vanity Award, consisting of a sketch of Colbert and a mirror. He also has been announced as the Person of the Year for the 12th annual Webby Awards.

In January 2010, Colbert received the Grammy Award for Best Comedy Album for his album A Colbert Christmas: The Greatest Gift of All!. He also announced the nominees for Song of the Year while toting a pre-released Apple iPad. Colbert was the 2011 commencement speaker for Northwestern University, and received an honorary degree. In 2013, Colbert again won the Emmy award for writing for The Colbert Report. In 2014, Colbert won the 2014 Best Spoken Word Album for his audiobook America Again: Re-becoming The Greatness We Never Weren't.

In January 2013, Rolling Stone placed him at number 2 in their "The 50 Funniest People Now" list. In December 2014, Paste named his Twitter one of "The 75 Best Twitter Accounts of 2014" ranking it at number 7. Colbert received an honorary degree from Wake Forest University as the 2015 commencement speaker.

In 2015, Colbert was awarded the third highest honor within the Department of the Army Civilian Awards, the Outstanding Civilian Service Award, for substantial contributions to the U.S. Army community.

In 2017 and 2018, Colbert was named one of "The 35 Most Powerful People in New York Media" by The Hollywood Reporter. He was chosen as one of GQ's "Men of the Year" for its December 2017 issue. Colbert was placed at number 32 in Vanity Fair "2018 New Establishment List". Other placements in earlier lists include number 40 in 2017 and number 28 in 2011.

In May 2021, Colbert received an honorary Doctor of Humane Letters degree from Yale University.

Ben & Jerry's AmeriCone Dream ice cream 
In February 2007, Ben & Jerry's unveiled a new ice cream flavor in honor of Colbert, named Stephen Colbert's AmeriCone Dream. Colbert waited until Easter to sample the ice cream because he "gave up sweets for Lent". Colbert donated all proceeds to charity through the new Stephen Colbert AmeriCone Dream Fund, which distributes the money to various causes.

Species named in honor 

At least five species have been given scientific names honoring Colbert. In 2008 a species of California trapdoor spider was named Aptostichus stephencolberti. The spider was named for Colbert after he reported on his television series that Jason Bond, a professor of biology at East Carolina University, had named a different species of spider Myrmekiaphila neilyoungi after the Canadian rock star Neil Young, and began to appeal for a species of animal to be named after him. On a later edition of The Colbert Report, Colbert revealed that Bond would name a spider after him, with Colbert claiming, "And all I had to do was shamelessly beg on national television." Other species named for Colbert include a species of Venezuelan diving beetle named Agaporomorphus colberti and a Chilean stonefly named Diamphipnoa colberti, both formally described in 2008. On his 45th birthday, Colbert was sent a framed print of his eponymous beetle by the biologists who named it. In 2014, a species of parasitic wasp from Ecuador, Aleiodes colberti, was named for Colbert, along with newly described species named for celebrities Jon Stewart, Jimmy Fallon, Ellen DeGeneres, and Shakira, and in 2016 a rove beetle, Sonoma colberti, was named after Colbert's on-screen persona.

COLBERT Treadmill 

In 2009, NASA engineered a new treadmill for the International Space Station. It was taken to the ISS by the Space Shuttle Discovery during the STS-128 mission in August 2009. The complex machine is now used eight hours daily by astronauts and cosmonauts aboard the space station in order to maintain their muscle mass and bone density while spending long periods of time in a zero-gravity environment. While engineers at NASA were constructing this treadmill, it was simply called T-2 for more than two years. However, on April 14, 2009, NASA renamed it the "Combined Operational Load-Bearing External Resistance Treadmill", or COLBERT. NASA named the treadmill after Colbert, who took an interest during the Node3 naming census for the ISS module, Tranquility.

Colbert urged his followers to post the name "Colbert", which upon completion of the census received the most entries totaling 230,539, some 40,000 votes more than the second-place choice, Serenity. The COLBERT is expected to last the life of the ISS and will have seen about 38,000 miles of running when the Space Station is retired in 2024 or later, but it was also built with a 150,000-mile lifespan (if needed until 2028 or beyond). Colbert realized he was the recipient of an extremely rare honor—the COLBERT (a backronym) is the only piece of NASA-engineered equipment in space that is named after a living human being—when astronaut Sunita Williams came on The Colbert Report to announce that NASA had named the treadmill after him.

Filmography

Film

Television

Video games

Theatre

Published works 
 Colbert, Dinello, Sedaris. Wigfield: The Can-Do Town That Just May Not (Hyperion, May 19, 2004) 
 America (The Book): A Citizen's Guide to Democracy Inaction (Warner Books; September 2004) 
 I Am America (And So Can You!) (Grand Central Publishing; October 9, 2007) 
 America Again: Re-becoming the Greatness We Never Weren't (Grand Central Publishing; October 2, 2012) 
 I Am a Pole (And So Can You!) (Grand Central Publishing; May 8, 2012) 
 Stephen Colbert's Midnight Confessions (Simon & Schuster; September 5, 2017)

See also 
 New Yorkers in journalism
 Political satire

References

Further reading

External links 
 
 
 
 
 
 Colbert interview transcript, 60 Minutes. (April 30, 2006)
 

 
1964 births
20th-century American comedians
20th-century American male actors
20th-century Roman Catholics
21st-century American comedians
21st-century American male actors
21st-century American male writers
21st-century American non-fiction writers
21st-century American novelists
21st-century Roman Catholics
American comedy writers
American male comedians
American male film actors
American male non-fiction writers
American male novelists
American male stage actors
American male television actors
American male television writers
American male voice actors
American media critics
American parodists
American people of English descent
American people of German descent
American people of Irish descent
American political commentators
American satirists
American sketch comedians
American television talk show hosts
American television writers
Audiobook narrators
Candidates in the 2008 United States presidential election
Catholics from Maryland
Catholics from New Jersey
Catholics from South Carolina
Grammy Award winners
Hampden–Sydney College alumni
Late night television talk show hosts
Living people
Male actors from Charleston, South Carolina
Male actors from Washington, D.C.
Male feminists
New Jersey Democrats
Northwestern University School of Communication alumni
Novelists from South Carolina
Peabody Award winners
People from Bethesda, Maryland
People from Montclair, New Jersey
Primetime Emmy Award winners
Screenwriters from Washington, D.C.
South Carolina Democrats
Television producers from New Jersey
Tolkien fandom
Webby Award winners
Writers from Charleston, South Carolina
Writers Guild of America Award winners